Roger Dubuis is a Swiss watch manufacturer of luxury watches based in Geneva, Switzerland. The company was founded by Roger Dubuis and Carlos Dias in 1995.

In 2008, the company was acquired by Richemont group.

The Roger Dubuis watches include the Excalibur and Velvet collections, along with motorsports watches in collaboration with Lamborghini, Squadra Corse, and Pirelli.

History

Roger Dubuis started his career at Longines in the late 1950s, and founded his own atelier in 1980 after 14 years of developing complications in Geneva for Patek Philippe. He took commissions to design new complications for major brands for several years. Carlos Dias, a designer for Franck Muller, joined Dubuis to launch the brand.

The Roger Dubuis Manufacture in Geneva was founded in 1995. After four years of development, In 1999, the company unveiled first watches that were fully designed and developed in-house.

In 2001, Roger Dubuis built his manufacturing facility in Meyrin, on the outskirts of Geneva.

In 2005, the Excalibur collection was launched, equipped with Double Tourbillon Skeleton movement.

In August 2008, Richemont Group acquired 60% of Roger Dubuis. In 2016, the group has acquired the remaining 40% of the company.

Co-founder Roger Dubuis died in October 2017.

Movements 

Roger Dubuis is one of the few Swiss watch companies that produce most of the components of its calibres in-house. Roger Dubuis calibers are made up of several hundred components finished by hand.

Roger Dubuis timepieces bear the Poincon de Geneve (the Hallmark of Geneva).

The main movements produced by Roger Dubuis are:

 RD820SQ Automatic skeleton watch with micro-rotor
 RD505SQ Single Flying Tourbillon
 RD01SQ Skeleton double flying tourbillon

 RD101 Quatuor, with four sprung balances

RD103SQ Double sprung balances with differential - this was the first Roger Dubuis movement co-created in partnership with Lamborghini Squadra Corse.

Roger Dubuis calibres are made of as gold, diamonds, and titanium, as well as new materials such as carbon, ceramic and cobalt. Most of the timepieces are skeleton watches.

Motorsport Partnerships 

Roger Dubuis started collaboration with the motorsport companies in 2017.

 Lamborghini Squadra Corse.
 Pirelli  - these timepieces feature rubber inlays from Pirelli tyres.

References

Richemont brands
Swiss watch brands
Watch manufacturing companies of Switzerland
Manufacturing companies based in Geneva
Manufacturing companies established in 1995